Al Khabaisi is a locality in Dubai, United Arab Emirates (UAE).  Al Khabaisi is located in eastern Dubai in the region of Deira.  The community borders Hor Al Anz to the north, Dubai International Airport to the south, Al Muraqqabat to the west and Al Twar to the east.

It is bounded in the north by route D 80 (Salahuddin Road) and to the south by route E 11 (Al Ittihad Road).  Al Khabaisi is a largely a residential community.  However, several corporations and automobile dealerships are located in Al Khabaisi, along Al Ittihad Road.  The area is also close to the Hor Al Anz bus stand and New Medical Center.

References 

Communities in Dubai